Robert E. Hughes (born March 10, 1971) is a former Major League Baseball catcher who played for the Milwaukee Brewers in  and .

Hughes attended the University of Southern California. In 1991, he played collegiate summer baseball with the Wareham Gatemen of the Cape Cod Baseball League.

References

External links

1971 births
Living people
Los Angeles Valley Monarchs baseball players
Major League Baseball catchers
Milwaukee Brewers players
Baseball players from California
Sportspeople from Burbank, California
Notre Dame High School (Sherman Oaks, California) alumni
USC Trojans baseball players
Helena Brewers players
Beloit Brewers players
Stockton Ports players
El Paso Diablos players
New Orleans Zephyrs players
Tucson Toros players
Louisville RiverBats players
Buffalo Bisons (minor league) players
Rochester Red Wings players
Wareham Gatemen players
Anchorage Glacier Pilots players
Alaska Goldpanners of Fairbanks players